Nordenham is a railway station located in Nordenham, Germany. The station is located on the Hude-Blexen railway. The train services are operated by NordWestBahn. The station has been part of the Bremen S-Bahn since December 2010.

The station is situated close to the Weser estuary, being the terminus for passenger traffic on the Nordenham to Bremen railway line. The line sees moderately dense through freight traffic to Nordenham-Blexen, where heavy industry is located.

Train services
The following services currently call at the station:

Bremen S-Bahn services  Nordenham - Hude - Delmenhorst - Bremen

References

Railway stations in Lower Saxony
Bremen S-Bahn